"You Can Sleep While I Drive" is a song recorded by American singer-songwriter Melissa Etheridge for her second album Brave and Crazy released in 1989. Country music artist Trisha Yearwood covered the song and released it in April 1995 as the third single from her album Thinkin' About You.  The song reached #23 on the Billboard Hot Country Singles & Tracks chart.

Chart performance

References

1989 songs
1990 singles
1995 singles
Melissa Etheridge songs
Trisha Yearwood songs
Songs written by Melissa Etheridge
Song recordings produced by Niko Bolas
Song recordings produced by Garth Fundis
Island Records singles
MCA Records singles